The Curtiss HS was a single-engined patrol flying boat built for the United States Navy during World War I. Large numbers were built from 1917 to 1919, with the type being used to carry out anti-submarine patrols from bases in France from June 1918.  It remained in use with the US Navy until 1928, and was also widely used as a civil passenger and utility aircraft.

Development and design

In late 1916, the Curtiss Aeroplane Company produced a new twin-engined flying boat, which was smaller than both the current Curtiss H-12 being built for Britain's Royal Naval Air Service and the earlier Curtiss H-4, with the new design given the factory designation Model H-14, although its design was unrelated to earlier Model H variants. The H-14 was a conventional unequal-span, unstaggered biplane, powered by two 100 hp (75 kW) pusher Curtiss OXX engines mounted between the wings. An order for 16 was placed by the United States Army before the prototype flew, but the prototype was disappointing and the US Army cancelled its order for H-14s.

The prototype was converted to a single-engined aircraft powered by a 200 hp (149 kW) Curtiss V-X-X engine, also in a pusher configuration, during 1917, being redesignated as the Curtiss HS-1 (for H model with single engine).  The prototype was re-engined for use as a testbed for the new Liberty 12 engine, becoming the HS-1L, flying in this form on 21 October 1917.

While Curtiss's V-X-X engine proved to be inadequate, as it did in its larger Model H cousins, the Liberty proved more suitable, and large orders were placed by the US Navy for the HS-1L. The HS-1 was armed with two 180 lb (80 kg) depth bombs, but it was found that these bombs were too small. In order to carry more powerful 230 lb (100 kg) bombs, Curtiss produced an increased-span version, the HS-2 with span increased by 12 ft (3.66 m) and an additional set of interplane struts, giving four-bay wings rather than the three-bay wings of the HS-1L. Again, Curtiss specified one of their own engines, and again, the Navy substituted this with the Liberty engine in the definitive HS-2L.

The HS-3 was a further improved version with a new, wider hull flat-sided hull, that eliminated the typical Curtiss sponsons.  The end of the war brought an end to plans to mass-produce this version, only six being built.

The HS-1L and -2L were built in vast quantities: 675 by Curtiss themselves, and nearly as many again by various contractors that included L-W-F (250), Standard (80), Gallaudet Aircraft Company (60), Boeing (25) and Loughead (2).  A further 25 were assembled by the US Navy from spare parts postwar.

Operational history
The HS-1L began to enter service early in 1918, flying anti-submarine patrols from a number of Naval Air Stations on the Eastern Seaboard of the United States, and from the Panama Canal Zone. Two HS-1Ls operating from Chatham, Massachusetts, made the only confirmed aircraft attack on a German U-boat in American waters on July 21, 1918, but this was unsuccessful, with bombs failing to explode and the submarine escaping.  From August 1918, in order to compensate for Canada's lack of patrol aircraft, US Navy HSs operated from two bases in Nova Scotia. Twelve HS-2Ls were donated to Canada at the end of the war.

Large numbers of HS boats were also used by US Navy forces in France, with deliveries starting on May 24, 1918, flying their first patrols on June 13. About 160 HS-1Ls and -2Ls were deployed to France. Following the Armistice, the HS boats based in Europe were scrapped apart from four aircraft based in the Azores, which were acquired by Portugal, while the US Naval Air Service shrank considerably, with many Naval Air Stations closing, resulting in considerable numbers of HS boats becoming surplus to requirements and available for sale at $200 to $500 without engines.  HS-2Ls continued in use by the US Navy as a patrol aircraft and a trainer until 1928.

Following the Armistice, eleven HSs passed into US Coast Guard service, remaining in service until 1926. As many as 83 HS boats were used by the United States Army Air Service for communications and survey purposes from overseas bases, although they were not given US Army serial numbers.

Surplus HSs were also widely exported.  Amongst Military users was Brazil, who received six aircraft in 1918. Two HS-2Ls were used in an attempt to bomb the rebel held Forte de Copacabana during the 1922 Tenente revolt.    Many were used in Canada as the first bush plane. One survives in the Canada Aviation Museum in Ottawa after being rescued from a Quebec lake.

Variants

 HS-1 - prototype with Curtiss engine.
 HS-1L - early production version of HS-1 with Liberty engine and short span (62 ft 1 in (18.92 m)) wings.
 HS-2 - longer-span version with Curtiss engine
 HS-2L - definitive production version with Liberty engine and long span (74 ft 1 in (22.58 m)) wings.
 HS-3 - improved version of the HS-2L, with new, wider hull and larger fin. Only six aircraft were built.
 HS-3L - Canadian modified version of HS-2L with modified wings (Clark Y section). At least three converted.

Operators

Argentine Naval Aviation Operated 12 aircraft from 1921 to 1931.

Brazilian Naval Aviation - acquired six HS-2Ls in July 1918. Retired in 1923.

Canadian Air Board - acquired 12 HS-2L from the US Navy following closure of its Naval Air Station Halifax. Likely transferred to Canadian Air Force in 1923.
Canadian Air Force - obtained HS-2L beginning in 1920. 12 likely transferred from Air Board when it disbanded and in total operated 30. All retired in 1928.

Mexican Air Force

Peruvian Navy - received at least three HS-2Ls in 1920, remaining in service until 1926.

Portuguese Naval Aviation - took over four ex-US Navy HS boats based in the Azores after the end of World War I, using them for training. Retired 1931.

United States Army Air Service operated in total 83 HS-2L
United States Coast Guard operated 11 until 1926
United States Marine Corps
United States Navy

Specifications (HS-2L)

See also
Canadian Vickers - three HS-3L built

Notes

Bibliography

External links

 Contemporary technical description of the HS-1L and HS-2L with photographs and drawings.

1910s United States patrol aircraft
Flying boats
HS
Single-engined pusher aircraft
Biplanes
Aircraft first flown in 1917